Ellipsoptera macra, the sandy stream tiger beetle, is a species of flashy tiger beetle in the family Carabidae. It is found in North America.

Subspecies
These three subspecies belong to the species Ellipsoptera macra:
 Ellipsoptera macra ampliata (Vaurie, 1951)
 Ellipsoptera macra fluviatilis (Vaurie, 1951)
 Ellipsoptera macra macra (LeConte, 1856)

References

Further reading

 

Cicindelidae
Articles created by Qbugbot
Beetles described in 1856